"Take Me to the King" is a song recorded by American recording artist Tamela Mann. "Take Me to the King" was released on June 12, 2012 as the lead single from Mann's third studio album, Best Days. At the 55th Grammy Awards, the song received a Grammy nomination for "Best Gospel/Contemporary Christian Music Performance". Also a huge commercial success, "Take Me to the King" topped the US Billboard Gospel Songs chart for 19 consecutive weeks. Mann performed the song on the 44th GMA Dove Awards in October 2013. In 2016, "Take Me to the King" was certified Platinum the RIAA for sales exceeding 1,000,000 copies.

Charts

Weekly charts

Year-end charts

Decade-end charts

Certifications

References

2012 singles
Gospel songs
2012 songs